The 2024 Vermont gubernatorial election will be held on November 5, 2024, to elect the governor of Vermont, concurrently with the 2024 U.S. presidential election, as well as elections to the United States Senate and elections to the United States House of Representatives and various state and local elections. Incumbent Republican Governor Phil Scott has not said whether he will seek re-election to a fifth term in office.

Republican primary

Candidates

Potential
Phil Scott, incumbent governor (2017–present)

Democratic primary

Candidates

Potential
Charity Clark, Vermont Attorney General (2023–present)
Sarah Copeland Hanzas, Vermont Secretary of State (2023–present)
Doug Hoffer, Vermont State Auditor (2013–present)
Mike Pieciak, Vermont State Treasurer (2023–present)
David Zuckerman, Lieutenant Governor of Vermont (2017–2021, 2023–present) and nominee for governor in 2020

General election

Predictions

References

2024
Governor
Vermont